Goli Kuh (also Romanized as Golī Kūh; also known as Gāv Kūh and Gulukūh) is a village in Kuhestan Rural District, Rostaq District, Darab County, Fars Province, Iran. At the 2006 census, its population was 102, in 23 families.

References 

Populated places in Darab County